Vox Dei is a political-religious pamphlet by Thomas Scott published in Utrecht in 1623. The pamphlet contains an attack on the Spanish match, and ends by anticipating the triumph of the 1624 parliament.

References

1623 books